Alyaksandr Rayewski (born 19 June 1988) is a Belarusian professional football coach and former player.

External links

1988 births
Living people
People from Mazyr
Sportspeople from Gomel Region
Belarusian footballers
Association football midfielders
FC Gorki players
FC Dnepr Mogilev players
FC Slavia Mozyr players
FC Khimik Svetlogorsk players